Rododafni castle is a palace in Penteli, Greece. It is located on the Lord Byron street on the slope of mount Pentelicus. It was intended as a summer residence for Sophie de Marbois-Lebrun, Duchess of Plaisance and is designed in a neo-gothical style, which was uncommon in 19th century Greece. The name of the palace means Rosetree castle.

History

Sophie de Marbois was married to Charles-François Lebrun, the former finance minister of Napoleon, who was awarded the title of Duc de Plaisance. They had a daughter named Caroline-Elisa (1804-1837). Her mother and she were both staunch supporters of the “Greek cause”. They actively and financially supported the Greek revolution in 1821. After separating her husband, the Duchess settled in Greece. Due to her vast financial resources, she was able to purchase large tracts of land in Athens and surrounding Attica, primarily in Penteli, on which she erected not less than six palaces and houses. Two of them were located in Athens and the other four in Penteli. 

The Villa Ilissia was her main house in Athens and was used as her winter residence. Today, it houses the Byzantine and Christian Museum. The Rododafni castle was intended as her summer residence and as a resting place for her daughter’s remains. Greek literature always attributed the design to the Greek architect Stamatios Kleanthis, but the historian Olga Fountoulakis discovered that the French architect André Couchaud was the main designer of the palace. Although Kleanthis was involved in the design of the auxiliary buildings of Rododafni. Construction started in 1840 using local Penteli marble. The Duchess did not see her palace completed as she died in 1854. There is a local legend that she had left the Penteli buildings half-finished without roofs and windows due to the superstitious fear that she would die when one of them was finished according the French writer Edmon About, who was befriended with the Duchess.

The Duchess’ nephew sold the estate and ownership transferred to the Greek state.  The building remained uninhabited and in ruins for more than a century. In 1959, the Greek state started with renovations using public funds. The architect Alexandros Baltzatis completed the restoration in 1961. The intention was to use the castle as a country house for the Greek crown prince. As such, the future King Constantine II of Greece used the palace from 1961 to 1964. Nowadays, it belongs to the municipality of Penteli, who uses it as a cultural centre and library, as well as for (cultural) events up to 1,000 people.

References

Sources

External links
  Rododafni castle at Municipality of Penteli’s website
  Rododafni castle history at Municipality of Penteli’s website
  Website on buildings in Penteli

Buildings and structures in East Attica
Neoclassical architecture in Greece
Palaces in Greece
Royal residences in Greece